Darkmans is a novel by Nicola Barker written in 2007. The 838 page book takes place in Ashford, in Kent and focuses on a father-son pair named Daniel and Kane Beede. The book was a finalist for the 2007 Man Booker Prize. It is the third of a loose trilogy by the author. The Guardian ranked Darkmans #93 in its list of 100 Best Books of the 21st Century.

References 

2007 British novels
Novels set in Kent
Ashford, Kent
Fourth Estate books